is a passenger railway station located in Kanagawa-ku, Yokohama, Kanagawa Prefecture, Japan, operated by the East Japan Railway Company (JR East).

Lines
Many services continue west of Higashi-Kanagawa via the Negishi Line to  during the offpeak, and to  during the morning peak.

Station layout 
The station consists of a single ground-level island platform serving two tracks, connected to the station building by a footbridge. The station has a Midori no Madoguchi staffed ticket office.

Platforms

History 
Ōguchi Station opened on 20 December 1947 as a station on the Japanese National Railways (JNR). With the privatization of the JNR on 1 April 1987, the station came under the operational control of JR East.

Station numbering was introduced on 20 August 2016 with Ōguchi being assigned station number JK14.

Passenger statistics
In fiscal 2019, the station was used by an average of 19,085 passengers daily (boarding passengers only).

The passenger figures (boarding passengers only) for previous years are as shown below.

See also
 List of railway stations in Japan

References

External links

 

Railway stations in Kanagawa Prefecture
Yokohama Line
Stations of East Japan Railway Company
Railway stations in Japan opened in 1947
Railway stations in Yokohama